Arvandkenar is a district (bakhsh) in Abadan County, Khuzestan Province, Iran. At the 2006 census, its population was 25,010, in 4,930 families.  The District has one city: Arvandkenar. The District has three rural districts (dehestan): Minubar Rural District, Nasar Rural District, and Noabad Rural District.

References 

Abadan County

Districts of Khuzestan Province